Silver Creek Township is the name of some places in the U.S. state of Minnesota:
Silver Creek Township, Lake County, Minnesota
Silver Creek Township, Wright County, Minnesota

See also

 Silver Creek Township (disambiguation)

Minnesota township disambiguation pages